The 2008 California Democratic presidential primary took place on February 5, 2008, also known as Super Tuesday. California was dubbed the "Big Enchilada" by the media because it offers the most delegates out of any other delegation.  Hillary Clinton won the primary.

Process
In the primary, 370 of California's 441 delegates to the Democratic National Convention were selected. Of these delegates, 241 were awarded at the congressional district level, and the remaining 129 were allocated to candidates based on the primary vote statewide. The remaining delegates were superdelegates not obligated to vote for any candidate at the convention. Candidates were required to receive at least 15% of either the district or statewide vote to receive any delegates. Registered Democrats and Decline to State voters were eligible to vote.

Polls

The latest six polls were averaged (only counting the latest Zogby poll).

Results

Notes
Turnout information is not available because Decline to State voters were allowed to participate. There were a total of 6,749,406 eligible registered voters registered with the Democratic Party and 3,043,164 who declined to state.

References

See also
2008 California Republican presidential primary
February 2008 California elections
2008 Democratic Party presidential primaries
2008 United States presidential election in California

Democratic primary
California
2008
2008 Super Tuesday